This is a list of Academy Awards television broadcasters. The Academy Awards, popularly known as the Oscars, are awards for artistic and technical merit in the film industry.

Broadcasters
Updated as of March 12, 2023

North America

South America

Europe

Asia

Oceania

Regional areas
This list includes broadcasters that are airing telecasts for specific areas and not specific countries

References 

Academy Awards lists
Academy Awards